François Gelhausen (25 May 1930 – 2 April 2001) was a Luxembourgian racing cyclist. He rode in the 1954 Tour de France.

References

1930 births
2001 deaths
Luxembourgian male cyclists
Place of birth missing